The 2016 Colonial Athletic Association baseball tournament was held at CofC Baseball Stadium at Patriot's Point in Mount Pleasant, South Carolina, from May 25 through 28.  The event matched the top six teams from the CAA's regular season to determine the conference champion for the 2016 season.   won their second title, and first in 15 years, and earned the Colonial Athletic Association's automatic bid to the 2016 NCAA Division I baseball tournament.

Entering the event, UNC Wilmington had won the most championships among active teams, with four.  James Madison had claimed two titles, while William & Mary, Towson, and third-year member College of Charleston each had one.  Former member East Carolina won 7 titles during their tenure in the conference.

Seeding and format
Continuing the format adopted in 2012, the top six finishers from the regular season will compete in the double-elimination tournament.  The top two teams received a single bye and played the winners of the opening round games.

Bracket

All-Tournament Team
The following players were named to the All-Tournament Team.

Most Valuable Player
Josh Smith was named Tournament Most Valuable Player.  Smith was an outfielder for William & Mary, who hit a grand slam in the eight inning of the decisive championship game as part of a 3 for 5, 7-RBI game.

References

Tournament
Colonial Athletic Association Baseball Tournament
Colonial Athletic Association baseball tournament
Colonial Athletic Association baseball tournament
College baseball tournaments in South Carolina
Mount Pleasant, South Carolina